FC Stakhanov is a Ukrainian football club. The club was based in Stakhanov, Ukraine.

Brief history 
Soviet championship
 Stakhanovets Stakhanov 1936 – 1941
 During World War II did not exist, Ukraine was occupied by Nazi Germany
 Shakhtar Kadiyivka 1946 – 1979
 Stakhanovets Stakhanov 1980 – 1991 (amateur status in 1987–1990)
Ukrainian championship
 Vahonobudivnyk Stakhanov 1991 – 1994
 Shakhtar Stakhanov 1994 – 1999
 Dynamo Stakhanov 1999 – 2004 (as amateur club)
 Stakhanovets Stakhanov 2005 (as amateur club)
 FC Stakhanov 2007 – present (as amateur club)

Managers 
List of managers
 1950 – 1952 Anton Yakovlev
 1956 Viktor Ponomaryov
 1957 Anton Yakovlev
 1957 – 1958 Valeriy Bekhtenev
 1958 – 1959 Aleksandr Petrov
 1960 Ivan Larin
 1961 Yakiv Borysov
 1963 Pyotr Shcherbatenko
 1964 – 1965 Volodymyr Soldatchenko
 1966 Viktor Sokolov
 1969 Volodymyr Soldatchenko
 1970 – 1971 Viktor Fomin
 1971 Oleh Bazylevych
 1972 – 1973 Vasiliy Vasilyev
 1981 Viacheslav Aliabiev
 1981 – 1983 Andrei Kuchinskiy
 1984 Petro Nykytenko
 1985 Anatoliy Cheremin
 1985 – 1986 Oleksiy Rastorhuyev
 1990 Serhiy Horkovenko
 1991 Oleksandr Hulevskyi
 1991 – 1993 Oleksandr Tkachenko
 1995 Yuriy Boldarev
 1996 Rostyslav Lysenko
 1998 Rostyslav Lysenko
 2005 Anatoliy Cheremin
 2007 Anatoliy Hladkykh
 2009 Dmytro Kharlamov
 2010 – 2011 Volodymyr Kuzovlyev
 2017 – Hela Dzhakonia

References

External links

 
Stakhanov
Stakhanov
1936 establishments in Ukraine
Amateur football clubs in Ukraine
Sport in Stakhanov, Ukraine